The 2013–14 Italian Rugby Union Championship was the 84th season of the Italian Rugby Union Championship.

Table

Results

Matchday 1

Matchday 2

Matchday 3

Matchday 4

Matchday 5

Matchday 6

Matchday 7

Matchday 8

Matchday 9

Matchday 10

Matchday 11

Matchday 12

Matchday 13

Matchday 14

Matchday 15

Matchday 16

Matchday 17

Matchday 18

Matchday 19

Matchday 20

Matchday 21

Matchday 22

2013-14
2013–14 in Italian rugby union
Italy